Dudley Township is one of thirteen townships in Henry County, Indiana, United States. As of the 2010 census, its population was 1,041 and it contained 454 housing units.

Dudley Township was established in 1822.

Geography
The streams of Glue Run and Roy Run run through this township.

Cities and towns
 Straughn

Unincorporated towns
 New Lisbon
(This list is based on USGS data and may include former settlements.)

Adjacent townships
 Liberty Township (north)
 Jackson Township, Wayne County (east)
 Posey Township, Fayette County (south)
 Washington Township, Rush County (southwest)
 Franklin Township (west)

Major highways
  Interstate 70
  U.S. Route 40

References
 
 United States Census Bureau cartographic boundary files

External links
 Indiana Township Association
 United Township Association of Indiana

Townships in Henry County, Indiana
Townships in Indiana